The men's 5000 metres walk event  at the 1989 IAAF World Indoor Championships was held at the Budapest Sportcsarnok in Budapest on 5 March.

Results

References

5000
Racewalking at the IAAF World Indoor Championships